Ediciones de la Flor is an Argentinian publisher, founded in 1966 by Daniel Divinsky and Ana Maria Kuki Miler. It is one of the few still independent  publishers of that country. It is known for publishing works of comic book authors, such as Roberto Fontanarrosa, Quino, Caloi and Liniers, in addition to publishing literary authors such as  Rodolfo Walsh, Silvina Ocampo and  Umberto Eco.

History 
The publisher began when the lawyer Divinsky and his legal partner Tito Finkelberg joined  with the editor Jorge Álvarez to open a bookshop. Not having the necessary capital for the company, Álvarez suggested to use the money (300 dollars) to instead buy book publishing rights.

In 1967 de la Flor published its first book, the anthology Buenos Aires, de la fundación a la angustia (Buenos Aires from the foundation to the anxiety),  including short stories by Julio Cortázar, Rodolfo Walsh and David Viñas. In 1970, Kuki joined the publishing house.  That year is published  the first book of Quino's Mafalda

Between 1977 and 1983, during the Argentinian military dictatorship, Divinsky and Kuki went into exile  in Venezuela, for having published Cinco Dedos  (Five fingers), a children's book considered "subversive" by the government.

References

External links 
 Official site (in Spanish)

Book publishing companies of Argentina
Publishing companies established in 1966
1966 establishments in Argentina